Cinta Larga is a Tupian dialect cluster of Brazil, the largest language of the Monde branch.

According to Moore (2005), Arara do Rio Guariba (Guariba River Arara), spoken in the northern part of Aripuanã Indigenous Park, is closely related to the Cinta Larga dialect cluster, and also shares some features with Suruí. 26 words were collected by Hargreaves in 2001. It remains unclassified due to the lack of data.

Phonology

Vowels

Consonants

References

Tupian languages
Mamoré–Guaporé linguistic area